Arvandkenar (also Romanized as Arvandkenār and Arvand Kenār) is a city and capital of Arvandkenar District, in Abadan County, Khuzestan Province, Iran.  As of the 2006 census, its population was 9,761, in 1,897 families.

Arvandkenar is the last port of Iran on the Arvand river (Arvand rud)

References

Populated places in Abadan County

Cities in Khuzestan Province
Port cities and towns in Iran